Zbigniew Zakrzewski (born 26 January 1981) is a Polish retired professional footballer who played as a striker.

Career

Club
He made his debut as a soccer player in Lech Poznań, when they played in second division during the 2000–01 and 2001–02 seasons. For the season 2001–02, Zakrzewski moved to Obra Kościan where he played until spring round of this season. In 2002, he moved to Warta Poznań, only to join Aluminium Konin a few months later.

In 2003, he came back to Lech Poznań, which whom he won the Polish Cup in 2004. Zakrzewski made 96 league appearances for Lech, scoring 27 goals.

In June 2007 he signed a four-year contract with Swiss Super League team FC Sion.

In 2008, he returned to Poland on a loan deal to Arka Gdynia. He scored four goals in his first four league games, including two against his old club Lech Poznań.

In July 2010, he moved to Warta Poznań on a one-year contract.

In June 2011, he joined Miedź Legnica.

Honours
Lech Poznań
Polish Cup: 2003–04

References

External links
 

1981 births
Living people
Footballers from Poznań
People from Poznań
Polish footballers
Ekstraklasa players
I liga players
II liga players
III liga players
Swiss Super League players
Lech Poznań players
Obra Kościan players
Arka Gdynia players
FC Sion players
FC Thun players
GKS Bełchatów players
Warta Poznań players
Miedź Legnica players
Puszcza Niepołomice players
Polish expatriate footballers
Expatriate footballers in Switzerland
Polish expatriate sportspeople in Switzerland
Sportspeople from Greater Poland Voivodeship
Association football forwards